That's Not Me may refer to:

Music
"That's Not Me" (The Beach Boys song), a 1966 song by the Beach Boys
"That's Not Me" (Skepta song), a 2014 song by Skepta and Jme
"That's Not Me", a Huey Lewis and the News song from the album Hard at Play (1991)
That's Not Me, 2004 album by American musician Randy Thompson

Other uses
Esa no soy yo (That's Not Me), a 2015–2016 Chilean drama television series
That's Not Me (film), a 2017 Australian independent comedy film
To Mee Navhech (That's Not Me), 1962 Marathi play by Acharya Atre

See also
Not Me (disambiguation)
That's Me (disambiguation)